Strigulioides is a monotypic genus of beetles in the family Buprestidae, the jewel beetles. The sole species, Strigulioides gabonica, was transferred to its own genus from Discoderes in 1986.

References

External links

Monotypic Buprestidae genera
Beetles of Africa